Despina Papamichail (born in Preveza, 9 February 1993) is a Greek professional tennis player. She has a career-high singles ranking of world No. 147, reached on 20 June 2022. Her highest doubles ranking is No. 162, achieved on 14 September 2015.
Papamichail has won 15 singles and 35 doubles titles on the ITF Women's Circuit.

Playing for the Greece Fed Cup team, Papamichail has a win–loss record of 20–25.

Career

2021: WTA debut
In June 2021, Papamichail won the inaugural $60k Charleston Pro event, by defeating Gabriela Cé. It was her first title above $25k level.

She made her main-draw WTA Tour singles debut at the WTA 500 2021 Abu Dhabi Open.

2023: United Cup debut
At the 2023 United Cup, she started the season with a win over Isabella Shinikova.

Performance timeline
Only main-draw results in WTA Tour, Grand Slam tournaments, Fed Cup/Billie Jean King Cup and Olympic Games are included in win–loss records.

Singles 
Current after the 2023 Monterrey Open.

WTA 125 tournament finals

Doubles: 1 (runner-up)

ITF Circuit finals

Singles: 23 (15 titles, 8 runner-ups)

Doubles: 65 (36 titles, 29 runner-ups)

Notes

References

External links
  
    
 

Living people
1993 births
Greek female tennis players
Sportspeople from Preveza